Suzanne Greenberg is an American short story writer.

Life
She graduated from Hampshire College and from the University of Maryland with an MFA.  She teaches at California State University, Long Beach.

Her work has appeared in The Washington Post Magazine, Mississippi Review, West Branch and The Sun.

She lives in Long Beach with her husband and three children.

Awards
 2003 Drue Heinz Literature Prize, for Speed-Walk and Other Stories
 2004 John Gardner Fiction Book Award finalist

Works

Juvenile Fiction

Non-fiction

References

External links
"Author's website"

Year of birth missing (living people)
Living people
American short story writers
Hampshire College alumni
University of Maryland, College Park alumni
California State University, Long Beach faculty